Sydney Renee Vermillion (born 7 March 1988) is a US-born Armenian footballer who plays as a defender for the Armenia women's national team.

Early life
Vermillion was born in Los Angeles County, California. She is of Armenian descent as her mother's maiden name is Fagrian.

College career
Vermillion has attended the California State University, Northridge in Northridge, Los Angeles, California.

International career
Vermillion capped for Armenia at senior level in a 2–0 friendly win over Lebanon on 8 April 2021.

References

1988 births
Living people
Citizens of Armenia through descent
Armenian women's footballers
Women's association football defenders
Armenia women's international footballers
Sportspeople from Los Angeles County, California
Soccer players from California
American women's soccer players
Cal State Northridge Matadors women's soccer players
American people of Armenian descent